Karnali Academy of Health Sciences is an autonomous medical institution of Government of Nepal established by an Act of parliament of Nepal on 20 October 2011. The main purpose of the academy is to provide medical service in the Karnali Province which is considered to be lagging behind in health facilities. It runs the government owned Karnali Zonal hospital in Jumla district.

In December 2021, a post graduate course was started by the academy. The teaching facility has capacity of 50 students per year. As per the government rules, 45% of the seats is reserved for the students from Jumla, Humla, Dolpa, Kalikot, Mugu, Jajarkot, Bajura, Bajhang and Achham districts. The 300 bed teaching hospital at Jumla was completed in 2017 but remained closed due to lack of equipment and medical professionals.

See also
List of hospitals in Nepal

References

External links
Official website

Hospitals in Nepal
Buildings and structures in Jumla District